Barueri ( or ) is a Brazilian municipality in the State of São Paulo located in the northwestern part of the Metropolitan Region of São Paulo.

Its boundaries are Santana de Parnaíba to the north, Osasco in the east, Carapicuíba in the Southeast, Jandira to the south and southwest, and Itapevi the west. The city is served by the trains of line 8 of the Companhia Paulista de Trens Metropolitanos (literally São Paulo Metropolitan Railway Company), (CPTM).

History

Barueri means "Red flower that amazes" in a Tupi–Guarani language. According to historians, the history of Barueri dates back to November 11, 1560 with the establishment of Nossa Senhora Da Escada Chapel by jesuit missionary José de Anchieta and his further settlement. The hamlet grew to the point of the construction, in 1870 of the Sorocabana Railway that initiated its duties in 1875 turning Barueri into an important point of connection between São Paulo, Santana de Parnaíba and Pirapora do Bom Jesus. Still belonging to the city of Santana de Parnaíba, Barueri was established as an independent city on December 24, 1948 due to its growth. In 1964, the city's territory shrank to two thirds of its original size when Carapicuíba emancipated from it.

Economy
Companies like Azul Brazilian Airlines, Enel, Cielo, Redecard, DASA, Walmart Brasil and others have their headquarters in Barueri.

Sports
The most notable football (soccer) club in the city is Grêmio Barueri, which plays at Arena Barueri, in 2009 played in the Brazilian top league. In February 2010 the team was moved to Presidente Prudente, a city that is located in western São Paulo (state). After moving to Presidente Prudente the team's new home stadium was Estádio Eduardo José Farah, which has a maximum capacity of 44,414 people.

Also in 2010, Campinas Futebol Clube, relocated to Barueri and became Sport Club Barueri. In 2017, Oeste FC also moved to Barueri.

In 2006, some 2006 FIBA World Championship for Women basketball matches were hosted at the city's Barueri Arena, which is an indoor sporting arena.

References

External links

 
  Official City Website
  Barueri Railway Station
  Encontra Barueri

 
Populated places established in 1560